The following are the winners of the 4th annual (1977) Origins Award, presented at Origins 1978:

Charles Roberts Awards

The H.G. Wells Awards

Adventure Gaming Hall of Fame Inductees
 Redmond Simonsen
 Dungeons & Dragons
 Empire

External links
 1977 Origins Awards Winners

Origins Award winners
 
Origins Award winners